William Beck (September 1, 1929 – February 16, 2017) was an American alpine ski racer. He  competed at the 1952 Winter Olympics and the 1956 Winter Olympics. Born in Melrose, Massachusetts, Beck  graduated from South Kingstown High School in Wakefield, Rhode Island, and skied for Dartmouth College in Hanover, New Hampshire.

Beck's fifth place in the 1952 Olympic downhill was the best result for an American male in that event for over three decades (tied by Pete Patterson in 1980), until Bill Johnson's gold medal in 1984.

Olympic results

References

External links
Obituary

1929 births
2017 deaths
American male alpine skiers
Olympic alpine skiers of the United States
Alpine skiers at the 1952 Winter Olympics
Alpine skiers at the 1956 Winter Olympics
People from Melrose, Massachusetts
People from Middlebury, Vermont
Sportspeople from Middlesex County, Massachusetts
Sportspeople from Vermont
People from South Kingstown, Rhode Island